Conus eldredi is a species of sea snail, a marine gastropod mollusk in the family Conidae, the cone snails and their allies.

Like all species within the genus Conus, these snails are predatory and venomous. They are known to sting humans, therefore live ones should be handled carefully or not at all.

Description
The size of the shell varies between 45 mm and 65 mm.

Distribution
The species is found in various spots of the southern Pacific Ocean, such as near Indonesia and French Polynesia.

References

 Tucker J.K. & Tenorio M.J. (2013) Illustrated catalog of the living cone shells. 517 pp. Wellington, Florida: MdM Publishing.
 Puillandre N., Duda T.F., Meyer C., Olivera B.M. & Bouchet P. (2015). One, four or 100 genera? A new classification of the cone snails. Journal of Molluscan Studies. 81: 1–23

External links
 The Conus Biodiversity website
 Cone Shells – Knights of the Sea
 

eldredi
Gastropods described in 1955